The 1929 Hong Kong Sanitary Board election was supposed to be held on 22 May 1929 for the one of the two unofficial seats in the Sanitary Board of Hong Kong.

Only ratepayers who were included in the Special and Common Jury Lists of the years or ratepayers who are exempted from serving on Juries on account of their professional avocations, unofficial members of the Executive or Legislative Council, or categories of profession were entitled to vote at the election.

Prominent Chinese lawyer Lo Man-kam was elected uncontested.

References
 Endacott, G. B. Government and people in Hong Kong, 1841-1962 : a constitutional history Hong Kong University Press. (1964) 
 The Hong Kong Government Gazette

1929 elections in Asia
1929 in Hong Kong
Sanitary
Uncontested elections
May 1929 events
1929 elections in the British Empire